Ryan Matthew Lilja (born October 15, 1981) is a former American football center and guard. He played college football at Kansas State, and signed with the Kansas City Chiefs as an undrafted free agent in 2004, and later played with them from 2010 to 2012. Lilja also played with the Indianapolis Colts from 2004 to 2009, with whom he won Super Bowl XLI over the Chicago Bears.

Early years
Ryan and his brothers were raised in Kansas City.
Lilja attended Shawnee Mission Northwest High School and was a student and a letterman in football and golf. In football, he was a three-year starter.

College career
He was a two-year starter at Coffeyville Community College before he transferred to Kansas State University, where he  was a two-year player who started 14 of 23 career games.  Lilja was named to the second-team All-Big Twelve squad in 2003.

Professional career

First stint with Chiefs
The Kansas City Chiefs signed Lilja as an undrafted free agent prior to the 2004 season. He was waived on September 5, 2004, with the intention of signing him to the practice squad if he cleared waivers.

Indianapolis Colts
On September 6, 2004, Lilja was claimed off waivers by the Indianapolis Colts soon after the Chiefs waived him.

The Colts re-signed Lilja on February 19, 2008, to a five-year deal worth $20 million.

Lilja was released on March 8, 2010. He started 59 of 66 games for them and two Super Bowls.

Second stint with Chiefs
On March 16, 2010, Lilja re-signed with the Kansas City Chiefs.

Denver Broncos
After announcing his retirement on December 31, 2012, Lilja agreed to terms to join the Denver Broncos on July 31, 2013. He was released on August 31, 2013.

References

External links

Kansas City Chiefs bio
Indianapolis Colts bio

1981 births
Living people
Players of American football from Kansas City, Missouri
American football offensive guards
American football centers
Coffeyville Red Ravens football players
Kansas State Wildcats football players
Kansas City Chiefs players
Indianapolis Colts players
Denver Broncos players
Ed Block Courage Award recipients